St Christopher School is a boarding and day co-educational independent school in Letchworth Garden City, Hertfordshire, England.

Established in 1915, shortly after Ebenezer Howard founded Letchworth Garden City, the school is a long-time proponent of progressive education.

Characteristics

History

Old Scholars
The Old Scholars club, officially The St Christopher Club, runs an annual meeting in July open to all former St Christopher pupils and staff. The Old Scholars club also hosts Matches Day for sports in the Spring. As well as reunions, the club also holds archives of old materials, from photographs of school buildings being constructed, to 'Green Cuisine' recipes.

Headships

Armstrong Smith (1915–1918)
Beatrice Ensor & Isabel King (1919–1925)
Lyn and Eleanor Harris (1925–1953)
Nicholas King-Harris (1954–1980)
Colin Reid (1981–2004)
Donald Wilkinson (2004–2006)
Richard Palmer (2006–2020)
Emma-Kate Henry (2020–present)

Notable former pupils

Ed Asafu-Adjaye, footballer
Catherine Bearder, Liberal Democrat politician
Gavin Campbell, actor, TV presenter and businessman
Neil Coles, golfer
Julia Darling, author
Jenny Diski, author
JJ Feild, actor
Sonia Friedman, theatre producer
A. A. Gill, journalist and restaurant critic
Connie Glynn, YouTuber and author
Freya Ridings, singer and songwriter
Paul Hamlyn, publisher
David Horovitch, actor
George Lamb, broadcaster
Rolf Landsberg, academic (Physical Chemistry) and University Rector
Prince Rupert Loewenstein, manager of The Rolling Stones
Olly Mann, comedian and podcaster
Neil Murray, musician
Shawn Slovo, writer
Richard Walker, angler
Michael Winner, film producer and director

References

External links
The school's web site
Old Scholars - The St Christopher Club
Profile in the ISC website
ISI Inspection Reports

Boarding schools in Hertfordshire
Private schools in Hertfordshire
Educational institutions established in 1915
1915 establishments in England
Letchworth
Buildings and structures in Letchworth